Aplysinellidae is a family of sponges belonging to the order Verongiida.

Genera:
 Aplysinella Bergquist, 1980
 Patriciaplysina Van Soest & Hooper, 2020
 Porphyria Bergquist, 1995
 Suberea Bergquist, 1995

References

Verongimorpha
Sponge families